Will Archer (born 1991), formerly better known by his stage names Slime, and now Wilma Archer, is an English record producer and multi-instrumentalist from Newcastle upon Tyne. He is based in London.

Early life
Will Archer was born in 1991 in Newcastle upon Tyne. He studied sound art and design at the London College of Communication.

Career
In 2015, Archer released his debut studio album, Company, under the moniker Slime. It includes guest appearances from Selah Sue and Jeremiah Jae.

In 2017, he released a single, "Like a Hunger", under the moniker Wilma Archer.

He is one half of the duo Wilma Vritra along with Pyramid Vritra. The duo's debut studio album, Burd, was released in 2019.

On 3 April 2020 he released his studio album, A Western Circular, under the moniker Wilma Archer. The album featured MF DOOM, Samuel T. Herring, Sudan Archives, and Laura Groves.

Discography

Studio albums
 Company (2015) 
 Burd (2019) 
A Western Circular (2020) 
 Grotto (2022)

Mixtapes
 In the Brick House (2014)

EPs
 Increases (2011) 
 Increases II (2012)

Singles
 "My Company" b/w "In One Year" (2015) 
 "Like a Hunger" (2017) 
 "Scarecrow" b/w "Cures and Wounds" (2018)

Productions
 Jessie Ware - "Something Inside" from Devotion (2012)
 George Maple - "Began to Say" from Vacant Space  (2014)
 Celeste - "Ugly Thoughts" from Lately (2019)
 Nilüfer Yanya - "WWAY Health™", “Paralysed", "Experience?", "Warning", "'Sparkle' God Help Me", "The Unordained", and "Give Up Function" from Miss Universe (2019)
 Sudan Archives - "Confessions" and "Glorious" from Athena (2019)
 Bullion - "Loving Furlong" from Heaven is Over (2020)
 Nilüfer Yanya - "Same Damn Luck" from Feeling Lucky? (2020)
 Nilüfer Yanya - "The Dealer", "Shameless", "Stabilise", "Chase Me", "Midnight Sun", "Trouble", "Try", "Company" from Painless (2022)

Remixes
 Lianne La Havas - "Lost & Found (Slime Remix)" (2012)

References

External links
 

1991 births
Living people
Musicians from Newcastle upon Tyne
English record producers
English multi-instrumentalists
21st-century British male musicians